Westport (historically anglicised as Cahernamart) is a town in County Mayo in Ireland. It is at the south-east corner of Clew Bay, an inlet of the Atlantic Ocean on the west coast of Ireland. Westport is a tourist destination and scores highly for quality of life. It won the Irish Tidy Towns Competition three times in 2001, 2006 and 2008. In 2012 it won the Best Place to Live in Ireland competition run by The Irish Times.

Westport is designated as a heritage town, and is one of only a few planned towns in Ireland. The town centre was laid-out in the Georgian architectural style, and incorporates the Carrow Beg river into the design composition. This provides for tree lined promenades (known as The Mall) and several stone bridges.

The pilgrimage mountain of Croagh Patrick, known locally as "the Reek", lies some 10 km west of the town near the villages of Murrisk and Lecanvey. The mountain forms the backdrop to the town.

History

Name
Westport originates and gets its name, in Irish, from a 16th-century castle - Cathair na Mart (meaning "the stone fort of the beeves" or "the city of the fairs") - and surrounding settlement, belonging to the powerful local seafaring Ó Máille clan, who controlled the Clew Bay area, then known as Umaill.

Development
The original village of Cathair na Mart existed somewhere around what is now the front (east) lawn of Westport House. It had a high street, alleys down to the river and a population of around 700. A small port also existed at the mouth of the Carrowbeg river. Roads lead from the village to the west (West Road), the south (Sandy Hill Road) and the east (Old Paddock Road). The intention of John Browne, later the First Earl of Altamont to move the existing Cahernamart settlement to facilitate the landscaping of parklands around Westport House was outlined to Richard Pococke when he visited Browne in 1752.

The first clear evidence for the development of the new town is in an advertisement in Faulkner's Dublin Journal on March 17, 1767, stating 'a New Town is immediately to be built near the old town of Westport...according to Plans and Elevations already prepared'. The focal point was to be a 'large and elegant market house' situated in an octagonal market area enclosed by 12 'large well-finished slated Houses. There were to be 'three avenues for streets of thirty slated Houses' and 'several very large streets for great numbers of thatched Houses and cabbins, to be built separately' at a cost of 20-40 guineas each. Workmen were to contact Peter Brown-Kelly, son of the Earl or the architect William Leeson
Westport is designated as a heritage town and is unusual in Ireland in that it is one of only a few planned towns in the country. Unfortunately, the original plans for the town are not available.

Its layout follows the medieval principles of urban design introduced by the Normans in the 13th century. A particular feature is the incorporation of the river into the composition, contained for two blocks by low stone walls producing, on each side of the river, tree-lined promenades (The Mall) with several stone bridges over the river Carrow Beg. The Malls were built by the First Marquess of Sligo after 1800. William Bald's map of Mayo which Was surveyed between 1809 and 1817, as well as Henry Browne's map from the same period, shows that the basic framework of Westport's streets including the Malls was present.

In 1778 Peter Browne, 2nd Earl of Altamont engaged James Wyatt (1746-1813) to redesign parts of Westport House, including its dining room. This led to a lasting belief that the well-known Wyatt designed the town, but work was already well advanced on the town when he started work. If he did have any design input into the town project it could only have been to later stages such as the Malls. Westport House was originally built by Richard Cassels (also known as Richard Castle), the German architect, in the 1730s, near the site of the original Ó Máille Castle.

Since the late 20th century, Westport has expanded with several new housing estates. Some of these include Springfield, the Carrowbeg Estate, Horkans Hill, Cedar Park, Fairways, Knockranny Village and Sharkey Hill.

Westport House

The original house was built by Colonel John Browne, a Jacobite, who was at the Siege of Limerick, and his wife Maude Bourke. Maude Bourke was Grace O'Malley's great-great-granddaughter. The house then did not have a lake or a dam, and the tide rose and fell against the walls.Peter Browne, 2nd Earl of Altamont acquired slave plantations in Jamaica by marriage. His grandson Howe Peter Browne (2nd Marquess of Sligo) was the Governor of Jamaica when the slaves were freed.

Designed by the architects Richard Cassels, Thomas Ivory and James Wyatt in the 18th century, Westport House is situated in a parkland setting with a lake, terraces, gardens and views overlooking Clew Bay, the Atlantic Ocean, Achill, Clare Island and Ireland's Holy Mountain, Croagh Patrick.

In January 2017, it was announced that a local family had purchased the house and grounds.

Economy
AbbVie a global biopharmaceutical company employs 1,400 people in Westport. AbbVie acquired Allergan in 2020.

Demographics

Between the censuses of 2011 and 2016, the town showed a limited growth from 5,543 to 6,198 inhabitants.

Culture

People from Westport town are traditionally known as "Coveys". Some decades ago the Covey dialect still existed and was unintelligible to outsiders. For example, the Covey word for a woman was a "doner".

Matt Molloy of the Chieftains has a pub and music venue on Bridge Street.

Another entertainment venue is the Westport Town Hall Theatre on the Octagon. This was established in the early 1900s, and renovated and refurbished in 2015. The Town hall hosts events, artists and musicians, local theatre groups and children's puppet shows.

Media

Newspaper
Westport has a regional newspaper based in the town, The Mayo News, founded in 1892 by William and Patrick Dorris. Other newspapers available are the Mayo Advertiser, Western People and the Connaught Telegraph.

Radio
Local radio is delivered by Westport Radio 98.2 FM.

Tourism

Westport is County Mayo's premier tourist destination, visited by holidaymakers from all over the world and Ireland.

In 1842, the English novelist, William Makepeace Thackeray, visited Westport and wrote of the town:

"The most beautiful view I ever saw in the world. It forms an event in one's life to have seen that place so beautiful that is it, and so unlike other beauties that I know of. Were such beauties lying on English shores it would be a world's wonder perhaps, if it were on the Mediterranean or Baltic, English travellers would flock to it by hundreds, why not come and see it in Ireland!"

Visitors visit Westport for the scenery, the pubs and restaurants in the town, blue flag beaches, and Croagh Patrick. Its proximity to Connemara, Achill, Clew Bay and Croagh Patrick, and its hotels and guest houses, make it a base for holidaymakers to tour the region.

Westport House and its Pirate Adventure Park attracts families. Westport has an 18-hole golf course and nearby a 9-hole course.

In January 2008, Westport became Google Earth's first fully 3D town.

Festivals and events 
Several festivals and events are held in and around Westport each year. These include the Westport Music and Arts Festival (which was rebranded as "Westival" in 2018 and moved from September to October), a Croagh Patrick walking festival in March, a sea angling festival in June, and The Saltwater Festival (of "Music, Food, Art & Culture") in May.

Religion

There are four churches in the town: The Elim Pentecostal church; Amazing Grace Fellowship, the Catholic Church, St Mary's; the Anglican church, Holy Trinity; the Evangelical church, Calvary Church Westport; 

In 1787 Lord Altamont gave the Catholic Parish Priest Dr Charles Lynagh a lease for a Catholic chapel and parochial house at Riverside. A temporary structure may have been erected as the chapel was not commenced for a quarter century later. The foundation stone was laid in 1813. Dr Oliver Kelly received support in this from Catholics and Protestants alike. The building was of cut stone in the Gothic revival style, and fronted onto the Malls which were under construction. The cost of the church was about £6000. By the 1920s the original gothic building was too small and the administrator Father Patterson raised funds for a new church. This cost £30000 and incorporated the old gothic facade in the Mall. The dedication occurred in 1932. Work began to build the present St Mary's church in 1957 with the demolition of the old church and completed by 1961.

Historically, a Methodist church existed on the Mall and a Presbyterian church on Distillery Road.

Church records for the 19th century (Church of Ireland, Methodist, Roman Catholic, civil, gravestone inscriptions, etc.) and other historical records for the Westport area are held at the South Mayo Family Research Centre in Ballinrobe and the Clew Bay Heritage Centre at Westport Quay.

Religious Orders
The two main religious orders historically associated with Westport are the Congregation of Christian Brothers and the Sisters of Mercy. Dean Bernard Burke wrote to the founder of the Sisters of Mercy Catherine McAuley in 1841 asking for sisters for Westport. None were immediately available but following a renewed request six months after the death of the foundress, the first three sisters arrived in Westport on 9 September 1842. The Dean gave them his own house, Carrowbeg House as a temporary residence, while he went into lodgings for two years.  On 24 December 1842 Lord Altamont agreed to Dean Burke's request for a site for a Convent for the Sisters. Dean Burke travelled all over Ireland and raised £3000 for the project. In the spring of 1843, the foundation stone of the new Convent was laid and the Convent built by John Gibbons to the same plan as the Convent in Carlow. Sister Paul Cullen was appointed by Archbishop McHale as the first Reverend Mother of the new convent. She was a sister of  Cardinal Paul Cullen.

The Congregation of Christian Brothers arrived in Westport in 1865.  They took over the Castlebar Street School for Primary and Secondary students. Initially, they were accommodated in Carrowbeg House. In 1922 they acquired Grove House on Mill Street from the Sisters of Mercy. Then they moved to their new residence on Newport Road where they lived until they left Westport in 2002

Education
Westport has two secondary schools, five primary schools and Westport College of Further Education, which opened in 2009.

The secondary schools are Rice College (528 pupils, all-boys) and Sacred Heart School (over 500 pupils, all-girls).

In 2006, Scoil Phadraig na mBráithre (tr. Saint Patrick's Christian Brothers' School) and Saint Patrick's Mercy National School amalgamated to form Scoil Phádraig (tr. St Patrick's School), a Catholic primary school under the patronage of the Archbishop of Tuam. It is the largest primary school in Westport with 300+ pupils and is located on Newport Road on the site of the old Christian Brothers School.

An all-Irish Catholic Primary School, Gaelscoil na Cruaiche was founded in 1995. It received official recognition in 2000 and moved into a permanent school building in June 2011. There are currently 207 pupils attending the school with eleven teachers.

Holy Trinity National School is a Co-educational National School on Newport Road under the patronage of the Church of Ireland.
The Newport Road School was a Church of Ireland school for boys and girls set up under the Kildare Street and Tuam Diocesan Societies and lodged in a new building (later called the lecture hall). The building was declared unfit following an inspection in 2010. The school is currently full with 62 pupils.

In February 2022 it was announced that the new school will be located on the grounds of the former Scoil Padraig on Altamont Street and not co-located with Educate together as previously stated. In 2020 staff and pupils had objected to the school being Co-located with Westport Educate Together

The Quay School, also known as Saint Columbkille's Primary School is located at the Quay, Westport.

A new primary school, Westport Educate Together opened in 2019. At first located at Sharkey Hill Community Centre, it is moving to new temporary premises at Westport Woods Hotel for the 2022–23 school year.

History
The educational facilities for boys in Westport were for many years associated with the Congregation of Christian Brothers. The first of these facilities was established in Castlebar Street in 1865 before transferring to the Newport road in 1962 where the former national school can still be seen today.

In 1987 the secondary school Rice College was built on Castlebar Road in order to cater for the increased educational requirements.

Transport

Rail
 
The town is the terminus of a 250 km Dublin-Westport/Galway railway line from Dublin Heuston in Dublin. This railway connects the town to Castlebar. Westport railway station opened on 28 January 1866. The line originally ran through to Westport Quay station (opened on 1 January 1875 and closed in April 1977). This line was lifted overnight in 1977 by Córas Iompair Éireann (CIÉ). In order to pacify local concern, the bulk of the trackbed of this extension was converted to a public walkway, still open today. There was also a branch to Achill Island branching off after the station, but this closed in 1937.

Bicycle
The Great Western Greenway is a greenway rail trail that follows the route of the former Midland Great Western Railway branch line to Achill, via Newport and Mulranny.

Road
The N5 national primary route also connects the town to Castlebar, as well as connecting to the N4 near Longford that leads onward to Dublin. The other major road passing through Westport is the N59 national secondary route.

Air

Port (Westport Quay)

Westport has a small adjoining port, the quay, once busy but no longer used for commercial shipping. In 1894, the harbour was the scene of the Clew Bay Drowning.

The quay area is now home to a number of warehouse conversions, and has several restaurants and pubs. The Clew Bay Heritage Centre, a small museum celebrating the history of Westport and the maritime history of Clew Bay, is open to the public here.

Sport
The Gaelic football club, Westport United soccer club and the rugby club have competed in county and national events. Westport, and the surrounding region, has been identified as a primary centre for adventure sports by Fáilte Ireland. Every August it hosts the largest one-day adventure multi-sport race of its kind in the world – Gael Force West. It is also home to horse riding, surfing, sea kayaking, windsurfing and sailing schools and other adventure sports.

Angling
Westport is an angling centre providing sea fishing on Clew Bay and game and coarse fishing on nearby loughs and rivers.

Clew Bay is also a sea angling centre hosting several sea fishing competitions each year, and is known as a venue for common skate fishing. It holds the Irish record for a 160 lb white skate. It is also home to tope, huss and ray.

Gaelic games
The Westport GAA club, CLG Chathair na Mart, have a history going back to the nineteenth century. Gaelic football is the main sport played within the club.

Golf
Westport Golf Club (championship) was in 2009 ranked 43rd out of the top 100 golf courses in Ireland by Golf Digest. The Golfers Guide to Ireland 2016 voted Westport as the best Parkland in Connaught for the second time in the preceding three years. It has hosted a number of tournaments, including the Ladies Home Internationals in 1989 and the Irish Amateur Close Championship on three occasions, the last time in 1997. It also hosted the Irish PGA Championship in 2002.

Soccer

Westport United football club was founded in 1911. Westport United won the FAI Junior Cup in 2005 in Kilkenny and play their home matches in the newly developed United Park, which opened in September 2016. Westport United still uses the Sports Park for some underage games. The club colours are red and black. Westport also won the Connaught Cup in 1942, 1945, 1949, 1961, 1974, 1987 and 2012 along with numerous Mayo titles. Westport United's training ground is located in The Quay area.

Rugby
Westport Rugby Club are located in Carrowholly, a few kilometres outside the town. League and Cawley cup champions in 2016 and junior cup champions in 2015.

Basketball
Westport Warriors Basketball Club run for all different age groups and are part of the MABB League.

Notable people

 Cornelius Coughlan (1828–1915), Irish recipient of Victoria Cross, died and buried in Westport
 George A. Birmingham (1865–1950), writer, rector of Holy Trinity Church, Westport. His play General John Regan caused a riot when staged in Westport.
 John MacBride (1868–1916), Born in Westport, he was executed in 1916 for his part in the Easter Rising; He is commemorated by a monument on the Mall; He was the father of Nobel peace laureate Seán MacBride 
 Joseph Maher (1933–1998), actor
 Séamus Hughes (born 1952), politician; Fianna Fáil Teachta Dála (TD) for the Mayo West constituency 
 Michael Ring (born 1953), Fine Gael politician; Teachta Dála (TD) for the Mayo constituency
 Lee Keegan (born 1989), Gaelic footballer
 Conor O'Malley (born 1994), footballer

International ties
Westport is twinned with Plougastel-Daoulas in Brittany, France and with Limavady, County Londonderry, Northern Ireland. The link with the latter has its roots in the 1980s and the official ratification and twinning ceremony took place in 2002.

Since 1982, Westport also has had a partnership with the town of Aror, Kenya, and the people of Westport have contributed to improving the infrastructure of Aror.

See also
 List of towns and villages in Ireland

References

Sources
Peadar O Flanagan, "An Outline History of the Town of Westport. Part 1. The origins and early development of the town 1750–80", in Cathar na Mart: The Journal of the Westport Historical Society; volume 1, part I, 1981; parts II-IV in volumes 2, 3 and 4, 1982–84.
Kieran Clarke, "Clew Bay boating disaster", in Cathar na Mart; 6, 1986.
Brendan Jeffars, Westport – an early Irish example of town planning, 1734–1950, Cahar na Mart; 8, 1988.
Jarlath Duffy, "The port of Westport, 1800–1850", in Cathar na Mart; 15, pp. 1–14, 1995.
 Vincent Keane,  "Westport and the Irish Volunteers. Part I:the early years, 1914–1916", Cathar na Mart; 22, pp. 84–88, 2002

External links

 
 Westport Tourism
 Westport Town Council 
 Westport GAA: CLG Chathair na Mart

 
Fishing in Ireland
Planned communities in the Republic of Ireland
Populated coastal places in the Republic of Ireland
Towns and villages in County Mayo